Neopolyptychus centralis is a moth of the  family Sphingidae. It is known from the Central African Republic.

References

Endemic fauna of the Central African Republic
Neopolyptychus
Fauna of the Central African Republic
Moths of Africa
Moths described in 2005